Coleophora capella is a moth of the family Coleophoridae.

References

capella
Moths described in 1990